John Eyton Bickersteth Mayor  (28 January 1825 – 1 December 1910) was an English classical scholar, writer and vegetarianism activist.

Life
Mayor was born at Baddegama, British Ceylon (now Sri Lanka) the son of Rev. John Major and Charlotte Bickersteth. His mother came from the prominent Bickersteth family and was the sister of Henry Bickersteth, 1st Baron Langdale and Rev. Edward Bickersteth. He was sent to England to be educated at Shrewsbury School and St John's College, Cambridge. Joseph Bickersteth Mayor was his younger brother.

From 1863 to 1867, Mayor was librarian of the University of Cambridge, and in 1872 succeeded H. A. J. Munro in the professorship of Latin, which he held for 28 years. His best-known work, an edition of the thirteen Satires of Juvenal, is notable for an extraordinary wealth of illustrative quotations. His Bibliographical Clue to Latin Literature (1875), based on Emil Hübner's Grundriss zu Vorlesungen über die römische Litteraturgeschichte, was a valuable aid to the student, and his edition of Cicero's Second Philippic became widely used.

He also edited the English works of John Fisher, Bishop of Rochester (1876); Thomas Baker's History of St John's College, Cambridge (1869); Richard of Cirencester's Speculum historiale de gestis regum Angliae 447–1066 (1863–69); Roger Ascham's Schoolmaster (new ed., 1883); the Latin Heptateuch (1889); and the Journal of Philology.

According to the Enciklopedio de Esperanto, Mayor learned Esperanto in 1907, and gave a historic speech against Esperanto reformists at the World Congress of Esperanto held at Cambridge.

His life and work are idiosyncratically and somewhat unsympathetically described in Juvenal's Mayor:  The Professor Who Lived on 2d. a Day by J. G. W. Henderson.

He is buried in the Parish of the Ascension Burial Ground in Cambridge.

Vegetarianism

Mayor succeeded Francis William Newman as President of the Vegetarian Society in 1883. Mayor was a strict vegetarian and teetotaller but it was noted that "he never sought to impose his rule of abstinence on others." Mayor authored What is Vegetarianism?, in 1886. His vegetarian writings were published in the book, Plain Living and High Thinking in 1897.

Selected publications

Nicholas Ferrar: Two Lives (1855)
Early statutes of the College of St. John at Cambridge in the University of Cambridge (1859)
Advent Warnings: a Sermon (1863)
History of the College of St. John the Evangelist, Cambridge (with Thomas Baker, 1869)
Affiliation of Local Colleges to the Universities of Oxford and Cambridge (1874)
Bibliographical Clue to Latin Literature (1875)
Modicus Cibi Medicus Sibi, Or, Nature Her Own Physician (1880)
What is Vegetarianism? (1886)
The Church and the Life of the Poor (1889)
The Latin Heptateuch (1889)
Thirteen Satires of Juvenal (1889)
Spain, Portugal: the Bible (1892)
Plain Living and High Thinking (1897)
Mercy, Not Curiosity, the Mother of Medicine (1898) 
Cambridge Under Queen Anne (1911)
Twelve Cambridge Sermons (1911)

Notes

References

The Cambridge History of English and American Literature

External links
 
 

1825 births
1910 deaths
Alumni of St John's College, Cambridge
Bickersteth family
British vegetarianism activists
Cambridge University Librarians
Kennedy Professors of Latin
English classical scholars
English Esperantists
English male writers
English temperance activists
Fellows of the British Academy
People associated with the Vegetarian Society
People educated at Shrewsbury School
Scholars of Latin literature